Ashleigh Barty was the defending champion but chose to compete in the women's draw.

Eugenie Bouchard defeated Elina Svitolina in the final, 6–2, 6–2 to win the girls' singles tennis title at the 2012 Wimbledon Championships.

Seeds

  Taylor Townsend (third round)
  Elizaveta Kulichkova (second round)
  Elina Svitolina (final)
  Anna Danilina (second round)
  Eugenie Bouchard (champion)
  Kateřina Siniaková (third round)
  Sachia Vickery (third round)
  Donna Vekić (quarterfinals)
  Daria Gavrilova (first round)
  Chalena Scholl (first round)
  Anett Kontaveit (semifinals)
  Indy de Vroome (third round)
  Allie Kiick (third round)
  Françoise Abanda (semifinals)
  María Inés Deheza (first round)
  Ana Konjuh (quarterfinals)

Draw

Finals

Top half

Section 1

Section 2

Bottom half

Section 3

Section 4

References

External links

Girls' Singles
Wimbledon Championship by year – Girls' singles